The 2012–13 Jacksonville State Gamecocks men's basketball team represented Jacksonville State University during the 2012–13 NCAA Division I men's basketball season. The Gamecocks, led by fifth year head coach James Green, played their home games at the Pete Mathews Coliseum and were members of the Ohio Valley Conference. Due to low APR scores, the Gamecocks were ineligible to participate in postseason play, including the Ohio Valley Tournament. They finished the season 17–11, 8–8 in OVC play to finish in fourth place in the East Division.

Roster

Schedule

|-
!colspan=9| Exhibition

|-
!colspan=9| Regular Season

References

Jacksonville State Gamecocks men's basketball seasons
Jacksonville State
Jacksonville State Gamecocks Men's Basketball
Jacksonville State Gamecocks Men's Basketball